Sportvereniging Die Haghe is a Dutch football club in The Hague, founded 1 November 1923. Its first squad plays in the Eerste Klasse Saturday since 2018. The club plays at Sportpark Ockenburgh in Loosduinen.

History

20th century 
From 1941 until 2001 Die Haghe hovered between the KNVB Vierde and Derde Klasse. It won section championships in the Vierde in 1949, 1959, 1962, 1978, and 1983.

21st century 
In 2001 Die Haghe promoted for the very first time to the Tweede Klasse through playoffs. From 2001 to 2018 it hovered between the Derde and Tweede Klasse. In 2018 it won its first section championship in the Derde Klasse, beating Quick Steps 3–1 in the decisive game. Die Haghe took its first championship in the Tweede Klasse in the subsequent season, scoring 1–0 against SV DSO in the victory game.

Since 2018, Die Haghe plays in the Eerste Klasse.

Associated people

Chief coach 
 1987–1990: John Huguenin
 1990–1994: Wim de Jong
 1994–1995: Simon van Vliet
 1995–1998: Wim de Jong
 1999–2002: René Pas
 2002–2005: Corné van Doorn
 2005–2006: Bert de Best
 2006–2009: Hans Verheij
 2009–2012: Fred van de Luitgaarden
 2012–2020: Wim de Jong
 Since 2020: Pieter Jongmans

Notable players 
 Mike van Duinen (youth)

References 

Football clubs in The Hague
Football clubs in the Netherlands
1923 establishments in the Netherlands
Association football clubs established in 1923